Grace Hospital is a regional hospital in Winnipeg, Manitoba, Canada. The 250-bed hospital is located in the Crestview neighbourhood of St. James-Assiniboia.

The hospital was founded on Ross Avenue in 1890 by the Salvation Army, as a rescue home for women and children. It was incorporated in 1904 as The Salvation Army Grace General Hospital, and was the first Salvation Army hospital to be incorporated in Canada. The hospital was not truly a general hospital until 1927, when it was expanded from a maternity hospital.

The hospital was located on Ross Avenue until 1906 when a new building was erected at Preston Avenue and Arlington Street. The Arlington street location would be expanded and upgraded many times.  The Arlington Street location was eventually replaced by a building in the St James area, for which construction began in 1964. The St James location officially opened in 1967.

The hospital was run by the Salvation Army until 2008, when ownership was transferred to the Winnipeg Regional Health Authority.

Deanna Durbin, a Hollywood actress of the 1930s and 1940s, was born at Grace Hospital on 4 December 1921 as Edna Mae Durbin. She moved from Winnipeg to California, USA in 1923.

References

External links
Grace Hospital

Hospital buildings completed in 1904
Hospital buildings completed in 1964
Hospitals in Winnipeg
Hospitals established in 1890